Amrit Pal may refer to:
 Amrit Pal (athlete) (born 1939), Indian track and field athlete
 Amrit Pal (actor) (c. 1941–2017), Indian actor